Alejandro Gattiker (born 5 May 1958) is a former professional tennis player from Argentina.

Career
Gattiker, having made it through qualifying, played Mike Myburg in the first round of the 1982 French Open. He was beaten in straight sets. The Argentinian played men's doubles at five Grand Slam tournaments, three with his brother Carlos, but was never able to get past the opening round. He made the doubles semi-finals at Kitzbuhel with his brother in 1981 and was also a doubles semi-finalist twice the following year, partnering Brent Pirow at Geneva and Ricardo Ycaza at Itaparica. As a singles player he had his best win when he defeated veteran Romanian Ilie Năstase in 1981, at Vina Del Mar.

Although he missed out on Davis Cup representation during his playing career, Gattiker had two stints as captain of the Argentina Davis Cup team. Players he has coached on tour include Marcelo Filippini, Hernán Gumy, Mariano Hood, Nicolas Lapentti and Mariano Zabaleta.

Challenger titles

Doubles: (2)

References

External links
 
 

1958 births
Living people
Argentine male tennis players
Argentine tennis coaches
Tennis players from Buenos Aires